Yannick Zachee (born 29 October 1986 in Meulan, France) is a Central African basketball player who is a member of the Central African Republic national basketball team. Born in France, he represents Central African Republic internationally.

Zachee formerly played for Fos Ouest Provence Basket of the French Basketball League.  Previously, Zachee had played for Chorale Roanne Basket and JA Vichy of the Ligue Nationale de Basketball.

Zachee was a member of the Central African Republic national basketball team that finished sixth at the 2009 FIBA Africa Championship.

References

1986 births
Living people
Citizens of the Central African Republic through descent
Central African Republic men's basketball players
Central African Republic people of French descent
People from Meulan-en-Yvelines
French men's basketball players
Black French sportspeople
French sportspeople of Central African Republic descent